Folke Viktor Wassén (18 April 1918 – 22 October 1969) was a Swedish sailor who competed in the 1952 Summer Olympics. Together with his younger brother Magnus he won a bronze medal in the 5.5 metre class event.

References

External links
 
 
 

1918 births
1969 deaths
Swedish male sailors (sport)
Olympic sailors of Sweden
Olympic bronze medalists for Sweden
Olympic medalists in sailing
Medalists at the 1952 Summer Olympics
Sailors at the 1952 Summer Olympics – 5.5 Metre
Royal Gothenburg Yacht Club sailors
Sportspeople from Gothenburg